This is a list of recurring linguistics conferences. Included are also a list of organisations that hold recurring meetings under the same name.

By geographical location

International
Association for Laboratory Phonology (LabPhon)
Formal Approaches to Slavic Linguistics (FASL)
International Conference on Sociolinguistics 
International Congress of Linguists (ICL)
International Society for the Linguistics of English (ISLE)
Southeast Asian Linguistics Society (SEALS)

North America
American Dialect Society (ADS) 
Canadian Linguistic Association (CLA)
Chicago Linguistic Society (CLS)
Linguistic Society of America (LSA)
North American Conference on Chinese Linguistics (NACCL)
West Coast Conference on Formal Linguistics (WCCFL)
Western Conference on Linguistics
Workshop on Structure and Constituency in Languages of the Americas (WSCLA)

South America
 Associação Brasileira de Linguística (ABRALIN)

Europe
Annual Meeting of the Societas Linguistica Europaea (SLE)
Days of Swiss Linguistics (DSL)
Generative Linguistics in the Old World (GLOW)
International Conference on Sociolinguistics ("ICS") 
Moscow Student Conference on Linguistics (MSCL)
Conference on Mediterranean and European Linguistic Anthropology (COMELA)
4th International ESP Conference, Nis, Serbia

Asia
Conference on Asian Linguistic Anthropology (CALA)
GLOW in Asia

Africa
West African Linguistic Society (WALS)
African Assembly on Linguistic Anthropology (AFALA)

Australia

By subfield

Phonetics
Acoustical Society of America (ASA)
Association for Laboratory Phonology (LabPhon)
New Sounds
INTERSPEECH
International Congress of Phonetic Sciences (ICPhS)

Phonology
Annual Meeting on Phonology (AMP)
Association for Laboratory Phonology (LabPhon)
Manchester Phonology Meeting (MFM)

Morphology

American International Morphology Meeting (AIMM)

Syntax
Dependency Linguistics (Depling)

Semantics
Sinn und Bedeutung
Semantics and Linguistic Theory (SALT)

Core theory (all of the above)
North East Linguistics Society (NELS)
Generative Linguistics in the Old World (GLOW)
West Coast Conference on Formal Linguistics (WCCFL)
Canadian Linguistic Association (CLA)
Chicago Linguistic Society (CLS)
Moscow Student Conference on Linguistics (MSCL)
Western Conference on Linguistics

Psycholinguistics

Cognitive linguistics

Documentary linguistics

Sociolinguistics and variation
International Gender and Language Association (IGALA) 
International Conference on Sociolinguistics ("ICS") 
New Ways of Analyzing Variation (NWAV)

Second Language Acquisition
European Association for the Teaching of Academic Writing
Generative Approaches to Language Acquisition (GALA)
Generative Approaches to Second Language Acquisition Conference (GASLA)
Generative Approaches to Language Acquisition - North America (GALANA)
Boston University Conference on Language Development (BUCLD)
European Second Language Association (EuroSLA)
Annual Conference of the Japan Second Language Association (J-SLA)
Congress of the International Association for the Study of Child Language (IASCL)
Symposium on Second Language Writing
4th International ESP Conference, Nis, Serbia

Language Testing
 Language Testing Research Colloquium (LTRC)

Computational linguistics
Annual Meeting of the Association for Computational Linguistics (ACL)
International Conference on Language Resources and Evaluation (LREC)
International Conference on Intelligent Text Processing and Computational Linguistics (CICLing)

Pragmatics

Onomastics
 Mainzer Namentagung

Miscellaneous

By language family

Indo-European

Germanic

Romance

Slavic
Formal Approaches to Slavic Linguistics (FASL)

Indo-Iranian

Uralic/Finno-Ugric
International Finno-Ugric Students’ Conference (IFUSCO)

Languages of Asia
Southeast Asian Linguistics Society (SEALS)

Sino-Tibetan
International Conferences on Sino-Tibetan Languages and Linguistics (ICSTLL)
Himalayan Languages Symposium (HLS)
International Symposium on Chinese Languages and Linguistics (IsCLL)
North American Conference on Chinese Linguistics (NACCL)
North East Indian Linguistics Society (NEILS)

Austronesian
International Conference on Austronesian Linguistics (ICAL)
Austronesian Formal Linguistics Association (AFLA)
International Symposium on Malay/Indonesian Linguistics (ISMIL)
International Symposium on the Languages of Java (ISLOJ)
Conference on Oceanic Linguistics (COOL)

Austroasiatic
International Conference on Austroasiatic Linguistics (ICAAL)

Papuan
Workshop on the Languages of Papua (WLP)

Altaic

Dravidian

Languages of Africa
World Congress of African Linguistics (WOCAL)

Afro-Asiatic

Languages of the Americas
Workshop on Structure and Constituency in Languages of the Americas (WSCLA)
Society for the Study of the Indigenous Languages of the Americas (SSILA)

Caribbean languages, including creoles

Auxiliary languages

Areal/non-genetic

Lists of conferences
Conferences